Julian Parkhill (born 1964)  is the Marks & Spencer Professor of Farm Animal Health, Food Science and Safety in the Department of Veterinary Medicine at the University of Cambridge. He previously served as head of pathogen genomics at the Wellcome Sanger Institute.

Education
Parkhill was educated at Westcliff High School for Boys, the University of Birmingham and the University of Bristol where he was awarded a PhD in 1991 for research into the regulation of transcription of the mercury resistance operon.

Career and research
Parkhill uses high throughput sequencing and phenotyping to study pathogen diversity and variation, how they affect virulence and transmission, and what they tell us about the evolution of pathogenicity and host–pathogen interaction. Research in the Parkill Laboratory has been funded the Wellcome Trust, the Biotechnology and Biological Sciences Research Council (BBSRC) and the Medical Research Council (MRC).

Awards and honours
Parkhill was elected a Fellow of the Academy of Medical Sciences (FMedSci) in 2009, and a Fellow of the American Academy of Microbiology (FAAM) in 2012. 

Parkhill was elected a Fellow of the Royal Society (FRS) in 2014, his certificate of election reads:

References

Fellows of the Royal Society
Living people
Academics of the University of Birmingham
Pathogen genomics
People educated at Westcliff High School for Boys
1964 births